Bertram Johnson (November 4, 1905 – January 9, 1976) was an American Negro league outfielder in the 1930s.

A native of Round Rock, Texas, Johnson attended Prairie View A&M University. He made his Negro leagues debut in 1932 with the Washington Pilots. He went on to play for the Baltimore Black Sox and Newark Dodgers, and finished his career as an East–West All-Star Game selection in 1938 with the Birmingham Black Barons. Johnson died in Round Rock in 1976 at age 70.

References

External links
 and Seamheads

1905 births
1976 deaths
Baltimore Black Sox players
Birmingham Black Barons players
Newark Dodgers players
Washington Pilots players
Baseball outfielders
Baseball players from Texas
People from Round Rock, Texas
20th-century African-American sportspeople